Jungle Jim's International Market, formerly Jungle Jim's Farmer's Market, is a large supermarket in Fairfield, Ohio, with a satellite location in Union Township, Clermont County, both near Cincinnati. The main location has been described as a theme park of food. Jungle Jim's offers one of the largest wine selections in the United States, live seafood tanks, and an in-store cooking school. Each week, the store is visited by about 82,000 shoppers, whom founder "Jungle" Jim Bonaminio calls "foodies". Many of the specialty foods in the store's Asian and European departments are difficult to find elsewhere in the Greater Cincinnati area, and customers have been known to drive from other cities for the store's wide variety of food.

History
In 1971, "Jungle" Jim Bonaminio set up a semi-permanent produce stand in a parking lot in Hamilton, Ohio. Over the next three years, Bonaminio moved the stand to several vacant lots throughout the area until he bought a plot of land. Due to the industrial zoning of the land, the city of Fairfield was reluctant to issue a permit for a commercial fruit and vegetable stand. After discussing an exception made for nearby fast food chain Arthur Treacher's, the city commission approved the permit. The first store opened in 1975 with 4,200 square feet of space.

Bonaminio continued to expand the store, adding products at customer request and enlarging and re-arranging the store.

Theme

Jungle Jim's unusual displays throughout the store gives it the feeling of a theme park. At the entrance, animal replicas are accompanied by occasional roars and the splashing of a miniature waterfall in the background. Inside are several animatronic displays, such as a lion that sings Elvis Presley songs at intervals and a "rock band" composed of General Mills cereal mascots. Several of the animatronics, such as the lion, a human character named Pedro, and a trio of blackbirds, are former Pizza Time Theatre animatronics (the lion character was known as "The King" at PTT, and served the same purpose of singing Elvis songs). The miniature storefronts in Jungle Jim's' European section represent the architectural styles of various countries, and the Mexican section is covered by what appears to be the adobe façade and wooden frame of a cantina. The hot sauce section is topped with a fire truck, the English section themed to Sherwood Forest, and subtle humor is injected into many parts of the store, such as the trashcans once labeled "Jungle Junk," the "Adult Oriented Hot Sauces" section, and the restroom entrances disguised as Rumpke portable toilets. In 2007, the restrooms won the Cintas Best Restroom in America contest. Before Jungle Jim's doubled in size in the late 1990s, the store featured flags from many countries that were positioned throughout the store and automatically waved back and forth, to give it an "international" feel.

Expansion
Around 2004, Jungle Jim's added a strip mall on one side, including Hallmark and CiCi's Pizza. In 1998, the store purchased the former "Lion Country Safari" monorail trains from Kings Island. A large Jungle-themed station featuring a giant snake façade was constructed behind the store and a second station was constructed at the Oscar Event Center to allow for guests to experience the monorail. Original plans called for the monorail to complete a circuit around the property, however, this has never been completed and unused supports still remain around the property. In 2019, the store opened "The Oscar Station", a bourbon bar experience housed within the monorail station. In January 2020, an expansion of the front end of the store was announced, adding 17,000 square feet to the store and space for tenants, including Graeter's ice cream.

Eastgate Location
On April 1, 2005, Bonaminio signed a letter of intent to open a second, smaller location closer to Cincinnati, but by April 2007, the project was canceled due to a lack of progress at the site.  On September 25, 2012, Jungle Jim's opened a second location at the former bigg's Place Mall in Eastgate.

The Oscar Event Center
The Oscar Event Center is a 34,100 sq. ft event space attached to Jungle Jim's International Market. Named after "Jungle" Jim's middle name, the event space opened in 2007. There are several venues within the event center: The Main Hall, The Lounge, The Outdoor Terrace, The Pub. The event space hosts several yearly events, including the International Craft Beer Festival, Weekend of Fire, International Wine Festival, Barrel-Aged Beer Bash, New Year New You, Big Cheese Festival, and Whiskey Night.

Jungle Jim's has been featured on the Food Network show Unwrapped, the History Channel show Modern Marvels, and ABC News' Good Morning America.

References

External links

Jungle Jim's International Market
The Oscar Event Center
Photos of Jungle Jim's at Flickr
 – founder Jim Bonaminio discusses the store's history for WCET-TV
 kicentral.com/history/monorail

American companies established in 1971
Retail companies established in 1971
Supermarkets of the United States
Companies based in Cincinnati
Buildings and structures in Butler County, Ohio
Tourist attractions in Butler County, Ohio
Fairfield, Ohio
1971 establishments in Ohio